Nestlow is an unincorporated community located in Wayne County, West Virginia, United States.

References 

Unincorporated communities in West Virginia
Unincorporated communities in Wayne County, West Virginia